Holy Trinity Church in Miejsce Odrzańskie, Poland, is a wooden chapel of ease belonging to St. George's Parish in Sławików, part of the Roman Catholic Diocese of Opole.  

The church was built in 1770 by carpenter Henryk Henschl.

References

Kędzierzyn-Koźle County
Miejsce Odrzańskie